Kurt Wagner (born May 1, 1953) is a German  television actor.

Wagner was born in Saarlouis in the Saarland, West Germany on 1 May 1953. In 1984, he played the first-billed male character in all 11 episodes of the television historical drama Heimat - Eine deutsche Chronik (equivalent to "Homeland, a German Chronicle").  In the 1990s, he had two more television parts, one in the same role, in an episode of the sequel to Heimat.

External links 
 

Living people
1953 births
People from Saarlouis
German male television actors